Abdelfattah Kilito (born 10 April 1945, in Rabat) is a Moroccan writer. He is the author of several books in Arabic and in French. He has also written articles for magazines such as Poétique and Studia Islamica. Some of the awards Kilito has won are the Great Moroccan Award (1989), the Atlas Award (1996), the French Academy Award (le prix du Rayonnement de la langue française) (1996) and Sultan Al Owais Prize for Criticism and Literature Studies (2006).

Life

Kilito was born in 1945 in Rabat, Morocco. He was raised in the medina of the old city of Rabat. Kilito learned French from the age of six. He also studied German, and was trained as a scholar of classical Arabic literature in the Faculté des Lettres at the Mohammed V University. Kilito is Professor of Arts at Mohammed V University in Rabat.

Bibliography

By Kilito

 
 

Thou Shalt Not Speak My Language, translated by Waïl S. Hassan, 2008, 
Je parle toutes les langues, mais en arabe, 2013, 
The Clash of Images, 1995 (translated by Robyn Creswell, 2010),

On Kilito 

Abdelhaq Anoun, Abdelfattah Kilito : les origines culturelles d'un roman maghrébin, Harmattan, Collection Critiques Littéraires, 2004,

Awards and honors

References

External links
Penatlas entry

1945 births
Living people
Moroccan writers
Writers from Rabat
Mohammed V University alumni